The Baloch Republican Party (Urdu: بلوچ ریپبلکن پارٹی) is an organization  in Balochistan headed by Brahumdagh Khan Bugti. Balochistan is the largest Province of Pakistan by land area.

Creation of BRP
BRP is an organisation that was formed in 2008 by Mr Bugti in Quetta Balochistan. After the creation of BRP Pakistani Government Announced a list of Banned organizations on 24 October 2012 BRP was one of them. No 41 on the list.

References

External links
Exclusive Interview of Brahmdagh Bugti by Qurat ul ain Siddiqui

Organisations designated as terrorist by Pakistan
2008 establishments in Pakistan
Baloch nationalist organizations
Balochistan
Banned socialist parties
Banned secessionist parties
Nationalist parties in Pakistan
Political parties established in 2008
Political parties in Pakistan
Republicanism in Pakistan
Socialist parties in Pakistan